The Kudu gas field is an offshore gas field in Namibia approximately  north-west from the town of Oranjemund.

History
Discovered in 1974, the license has been held by a number of companies including Royal Dutch Shell, Chevron Texaco and Energy Africa. In 2004, Tullow Oil acquired Energy Africa for US$570 million and with its 90% interest in the license. Later Tullow Oil sold 20% of the project to Itochu.  The remaining 10% is held by Namibian state oil company Namcor.

On Tuesday, 18 September 2007, shares of Tullow Oil declined by more than 3.0% after the group announced that it had to abandon the Kudu-8 exploration well offshore Namibia and that a second well planned nearby won't be drilled.

In 2010, Namcor and Russian gas company Gazprom agreed to establish a special purpose company to take a majority stake in the Kudu gas field.

In 2017, BW Kudu, a subsidiary of BW Offshore, entered into a Farm-Out Agreement for a 56% stake of the Kudu license. Namcor holds the remaining 44% stake in the license.

Reserves
These figures though are dependent on further work that is yet to be carried out by Tullow Oil on different parts of the field with other geological settings.

Development
Suggested development of the field has been for a subsea tie back which would potentially make it one of the world's longest. The tie back would connect it to an 800-megawatt power plant to be located near Oranjemund.  The field would be crucial in meeting Namibia's growing energy demand, as the country is currently facing a power crisis. The commissioning of Kudu gas and the additional power capacity of 400 MW (half of the total capacity of 800 MW is determined to benefit Namibia), the looming power shortages could be prevented.

References

External links

Oil fields of Namibia
Natural gas fields in Namibia
ǁKaras Region